Dehninio Muringen (born 1 February 1999) is a Dutch professional footballer who plays as a defender for Estonian Meistriliiga club Paide Linnameeskond.

Professional career
Muringen made his professional debut with ADO Den Haag in a 3-3 Eredivisie tie with Willem II on 23 November 2019.

On 6 January 2022, Muringen signed with Roda.

On 27 September 2022 he joined Estonian Meistriliiga club Paide Linnameeskond with 2-year deal.

Personal life
Born in the Netherlands, Muringen is of Surinamese descent. Muringen is the brother of the late footballer Kelvin Maynard.

References

External links
 
 
 ADO Den Haag Profile

1999 births
Dutch sportspeople of Surinamese descent
Footballers from Amsterdam
Living people
Dutch footballers
Association football defenders
ADO Den Haag players
FC Dordrecht players
Roda JC Kerkrade players
Paide Linnameeskond players
Eredivisie players
Eerste Divisie players

Dutch expatriate footballers
Expatriate footballers in Estonia
Dutch expatriate sportspeople in Estonia